Pier Francesco Fiorentino (1444/1445 –  after 1497) was a 15th-century painter active in San Gimignano for much of his mature life, depicting religious-themed subjects.

Biography
Fiorentino was born in Florence, the son of the Florentine painter Bartolomeo di Donato, and received his first art education in his father's workshop. At age 25 he was ordained a priest. He joined in the circle of painter Benozzo Gozzoli and worked with him in San Gimignano and Certaldo during the 1460s.

Works
An altarpiece in the Gallery at Empoli dates from about 1474. In 1475 he worked together with Domenico Ghirlandaio on the decoration of the nave of the Duomo of San Gimignano. In that same year he painted an Enthroned Madonna and Child with Saints Matthew the Apostle, William hermit, Barbara and Sebastiano for the Chapel of St William in the Collegiata of Empoli; the work is now exhibited in the Museum adjoining the church. He signed a Madonna and Saints (1494) in Sant'Agostino Church, San Gimignano and a Tobias and the Angels (1497).

See also
Anonymous masters

References

Sources
 Anna Padoa Rizzo (eds), Art and patronage in Val d'Elsa and Era, Florence, Octavo, 1997, pp. 34–45, 66, 77–78, 81–82, 114 – 115 
 Francesca Allegri – Massimo Tosi, Certaldo poetry of the Middle Ages, series "Millennial Elsa Valley", Certaldo (Florence), Federighi Publishers, 2002, pp. 102–103 (on the frescoes of the Praetorian Palace of Certaldo).
 Rosanna Caterina Proto Pisani, Empoli. Routes of the Museum of the Collegiate Church and the Church of Santo Stefano, "Lo Studiolo", Florence, Becocci – Scala, 2005, pp. 39, 42.
 Rosanna Caterina Proto Pisani (eds), Museum of the Collegiate Church of Sant'Andrea in Empoli, series "Small Great Museums", Florence, Polistampa Publishing, 2006, pp. 110–111 .
 R. Razzi, The Sanctuary of the Madonna di San Gimignano in Pancole. The History and the Image, Poggibonsi, Graphic Arts Nencini, 2002.

1444 births
1497 deaths
Quattrocento painters
Italian male painters
15th-century Italian painters
Painters from Florence